Mary Marston is a novel by George MacDonald, written in 1881 and later republished as A Daughter's Devotion.

Written at the height of George MacDonald's literary career, the story centers around the life of a simple merchant's daughter. Mary Marston's unswerving commitment to love God and others is contrasted with a backdrop of an array of characters and a complex and sometimes mysterious plot.

It is a story of a woman who loves a man, and teaches him to change. Not out of his love for her, but simply because it was the right thing to do.

MacDonald allows the characters a range from delightful to devious. As such, they were intended to serve as models. His message is that all eventually must stand before God.

References

Modern edition
A Daughter’s Devotion, Michael R. Phillips, editor. Minneapolis, Minn. : Bethany House Publishers, c1988.

External links

 

1881 British novels
Scottish novels
Novels by George MacDonald